In graph theory and computer science, the lowest common ancestor (LCA) (also called least common ancestor) of two nodes  and  in a tree or directed acyclic graph (DAG)   is the lowest (i.e. deepest) node that has both  and  as descendants, where we define each node to be a descendant of itself (so if  has a direct connection from ,  is the lowest common ancestor).

In ontologies, the lowest common ancestor is also known as the least common ancestor.

In general, the computational time required for this algorithm is  where  is the height of the tree (length of longest path from a leaf to the root). However, there exist several algorithms for processing trees so that lowest common ancestors may be found more quickly. Tarjan's off-line lowest common ancestors algorithm, for example, preprocesses a tree in linear time to provide constant-time LCA queries. In general DAGs, similar algorithms exist, but with super-linear complexity.

History

Their algorithm processes any tree in linear time, using a heavy path decomposition, so that subsequent lowest common ancestor queries may be answered in constant time per query. However, their data structure is complex and difficult to implement. Tarjan also found a simpler but less efficient algorithm, based on the union-find data structure, for computing lowest common ancestors of an offline batch of pairs of nodes.

 simplified the data structure of Harel and Tarjan, leading to an implementable structure with the same asymptotic preprocessing and query time bounds. Their simplification is based on the principle that, in two special kinds of trees, lowest common ancestors are easy to determine: if the tree is a path, then the lowest common ancestor can be computed simply from the minimum of the levels of the two queried nodes, while if the tree is a complete binary tree, the nodes may be indexed in such a way that lowest common ancestors reduce to simple binary operations on the indices. The structure of Schieber and Vishkin decomposes any tree into a collection of paths, such that the connections between the paths have the structure of a binary tree, and combines both of these two simpler indexing techniques.

 discovered a completely new way to answer lowest common ancestor queries, again achieving linear preprocessing time with constant query time. Their method involves forming an Euler tour of a graph formed from the input tree by doubling every edge, and using this tour to write a sequence of level numbers of the nodes in the order the tour visits them; a lowest common ancestor query can then be transformed into a query that seeks the minimum value occurring within some subinterval of this sequence of numbers. They then handle this range minimum query problem (RMQ) by combining two techniques, one technique based on precomputing the answers to large intervals that have sizes that are powers of two, and the other based on table   lookup for small-interval queries.

 proposed the dynamic LCA variant of the problem in which the data structure should be prepared to handle LCA queries intermixed with operations that change the tree (that is, rearrange the tree by adding and removing edges). This variant can be solved in  time in the total size of the tree for all modifications and queries. This is done by maintaining the forest using the dynamic trees data structure with partitioning by size; this then maintains a heavy-light decomposition of each tree, and allows LCA queries to be carried out in logarithmic time in the size of the tree.

Linear space and constant search time solution to tree based LCA problem 
As mentioned above, LCA can be reduced into RMQ first, then divided the sequence of numbers into intervals and apply two different techniques to handle range minimum query across different intervals, and handle range minimum query within an interval.

Reduction from LCA to RMQ 
Reduction of LCA into RMQ started by walking the tree. When walking the tree, the order of the label and the depth of the node visited is recorded. Then a LCA question can be answered by answering a RMQ question which the input of a RMQ problem is the indices of two child nodes in the list of visited nodes. 

Therefore, LCA can be solved by solving RMQ.

Linear space and constant search time algorithm for RMQ reduced from LCA 
Despite that there exists a constant time and linear space solution for general RMQ, but a simplified solution can be applied that make uses of LCA’s properties. This simplified solution can only be used for RMQ reduced from LCA.

By splitting the sequence into blocks, the  query can be solved by solving two different cases:

Case 1: if i and j are in different blocks 
To answer the  query in case one, there are 3 groups of variables precomputed to help reduce query time. 

A set of  takes  space.

There are  blocks, so the lookup table in that solution takes  space. Because ,  =  space. Hence, the precomputed RMQ query using the solution with constant time and linearithmic space on these blocks only take  space.

Third, in each block , let  be an index in  such that . Each iteration of  computes a pair of prefix min and suffix min. Since there are  blocks, in total, all prefix min and suffix min arrays take  which is  spaces.

In total, it takes  space to store all 3 groups of precomputed variables mentioned above.

Therefore, answering the  query in case 1 is simply tasking the minimum of the following three questions:

 Answering the RMQ query on a subset of s from blocks using the solution with constant time and linearithmic space

All 3 questions can be answered in constant time. Hence, case 1 can be answered in linear space and constant time.

Case 2: if i and j are in the same block 
The sequence of RMQ that reduced from LCA has one property that a normal RMQ doesn’t have. The next element is always +1 or -1 from the current element. For example:

Therefore, each block  can be encoded as a bitstring with 0 represents the current depth -1, and 1 represent the current depth +1. This transformation turns a block into a bitstring of size . A bitstring of size  has  possible bitstrings. Since , so .

Then, for each possible bitstrings, we apply the naïve quadratic space constant time solution.

Therefore, answering the  query in case 2 is simply finding the corresponding block (in which is a bitstring) and perform a table lookup for that bitstring. Hence, case 2 can be solved using linear space with constant searching time.

Extension to directed acyclic graphs

While originally studied in the context of trees, the notion of lowest common ancestors can be defined for directed acyclic graphs (DAGs), using either of two possible definitions. In both, the edges of the DAG are assumed to point from parents to children.

In a tree, the lowest common ancestor is unique; in a DAG of  nodes, each pair of nodes may have as much as  LCAs , while the existence of an LCA for a pair of nodes is not even guaranteed in arbitrary connected DAGs.

Better algorithms exist that, analogous to the LCA algorithms on trees, preprocess a graph to enable constant-time LCA queries.

 present a unified framework for preprocessing directed acyclic graphs to compute a representative lowest common ancestor in a rooted DAG in constant time. Their framework can achieve near-linear preprocessing times for sparse graphs and is available for public use.

Applications
The problem of computing lowest common ancestors of classes in an inheritance hierarchy arises in the implementation of object-oriented programming systems . The LCA problem also finds applications in models of complex systems found in distributed computing .

See also
Level ancestor problem
Semilattice

References

.
.
. A preliminary version appeared in SPAA 2002.
.
 .
.

.
.
.
.

.

External links
 Lowest Common Ancestor of a Binary Search Tree, by Kamal Rawat
 Python implementation of the algorithm of Bender and Farach-Colton for trees, by David Eppstein
 Python implementation for arbitrary directed acyclic graphs
 Lecture notes on LCAs from a 2003 MIT Data Structures course. Course by Erik Demaine, notes written by Loizos Michael and Christos Kapoutsis. Notes from 2007 offering of same course, written by Alison Cichowlas.
 Lowest Common Ancestor in Binary Trees in C. A simplified version of the Schieber–Vishkin technique that works only for balanced binary trees.
 Video of Donald Knuth explaining the Schieber–Vishkin technique
 Range Minimum Query and Lowest Common Ancestor article in Topcoder
 Documentation for the lca package for Haskell by Edward Kmett, which includes the skew-binary random access list algorithm. Purely functional data structures for on-line LCA slides for the same package.

Theoretical computer science
Trees (graph theory)